Claus Herluf Stenholt Clausen (October 21, 1921, Los Angeles – 2002) was a Danish ichthyologist, known for his work on the river fish of West Africa. Although often cited as H. S. Clausen, he published as H. Stenholt Clausen, with the compound surname Stenholt Clausen. He worked for many years at the University College of Ibadan in Nigeria.

Phractura clauseni, a species of catfish, is named in his honor, as is the ray-finned fish Enteromius clauseni.

His son, Ian Henning Stenholt Clausen, became an arachnologist.

References

1921 births
2002 deaths
Danish ichthyologists
20th-century Danish zoologists
Danish expatriates in Nigeria